The Shakespeare Company is a subsidiary of Pure Fishing which manufactures fishing equipment. It was founded by William Shakespeare, Jr. in Kalamazoo, Michigan in 1897. It was moved to Columbia, South Carolina in 1970.

In June 2005, approximately 438,000 of their children's fishing kits were recalled after being found to contain lead paint.

References

Manufacturing companies established in 1897
Fishing equipment manufacturers
Manufacturing companies based in South Carolina
1897 establishments in Michigan
2007 mergers and acquisitions
2016 mergers and acquisitions